The German locomotive series Renner to Greif comprised passenger train, tender locomotives operated by the Leipzig–Dresden Railway Company (LDE).

History 
The five locomotives were delivered in 1837 and 1839 by Thomas Kirtley & Co., Warrington, Lancashire to the LDE. They were given the names: RENNER, STURM, ELEPHANT, WILLIAM CURTLEY and GREIF.

These locomotives were retired between 1851 and 1858.

See also
 Royal Saxon State Railways
 List of Saxon locomotives and railbuses
 Leipzig–Dresden Railway Company

Sources 

 
 

2-2-2 locomotives
Locomotives of Saxony
Early steam locomotives
Standard gauge locomotives of Germany

Passenger locomotives